British girl group the Spice Girls, consisting of Melanie Brown, also known as Mel B ("Scary Spice"); Melanie Chisholm, or Melanie C ("Sporty Spice"); Emma Bunton ("Baby Spice"); Geri Halliwell ("Ginger Spice"), and Victoria Beckham ("Posh Spice"), has headlined five concert tours, and performed at several TV and award shows.

They first promoted their debut album, Spice (1996), in 1996 and 1997, through performances at several award ceremonies and television shows, including the Brit Awards 1997 and Top of the Pops; and their two-night concert Girl Power! Live in Istanbul. They the girls promoted their second studio album, Spiceworld (1997), throughout 1997 and 1998, performing many times on television, in both Europe and the US, in shows such as An Audience with..., Top of the Pops, All That, The Jay Leno Show, Late Show with David Letterman, and The Oprah Winfrey Show.

On 24 February 1998 they embarked on their first world tour Spiceworld Tour, and in May 1998, Halliwell left the Spice Girls, citing exhaustion and creative differences. The group carried on as a four-piece with the tour, which was attended by an estimated 2.1 million people to become the highest-grossing concert tour by a female group.

In April 1999 after a period of hiatus, during which the members of the group launched their solo careers and focused on their personal lives, they announced a UK Christmas tour for that year, Christmas in Spiceworld Tour, which was held between 4–15 December.

Forever (2000), the only Spice Girls album without Halliwell, achieved weaker sales. At the end of 2000, the Spice Girls entered a hiatus to concentrate on their solo careers. They reunited for two concert tours, The Return of the Spice Girls Tour (2007–2008), and Spice World – 2019 Tour, both of which won the Billboard Live Music Award for highest-grossing engagements, making them the top touring all-female group from 2000 to 2020, grossing nearly $150 million in ticket sales across 58 shows.

Concert tours

Promotional concert

One-off concerts

Benefit concerts

Festival concerts

Performances at award shows

Television shows and specials

Notes

References

Citations

Book references
 
 
 

Spice Girls concert tours
Lists of concerts and performances